Spring Valley is a residential neighbourhood in the city of Nairobi.

Location
It borders the Barton and the Kyuna neighbourhoods.

Overview
Spring Valley was zoned as a low-density neighbourhood, but over the years residential flats were allowed. Single family residential units are more common in Upper Spring Valley. It has slowly become more middle-class as the mushrooming of flats started. It has a mixture of modern, old and pre-modern architecture.

As per the 2019 census, Spring Valley had a population of 6,804, with a population density of 2,432/km2 in a land area of 2.8km2.

References

 

Suburbs of Nairobi